Reisser is a surname. Notable people with the surname include:

Earl Reisser (1899–1956), American football player
Michael Reisser (1946–1988), Israeli politician
Raymond Reisser (1931–2017), French cyclist

See also
Reister
Risser